is a Japanese female badminton player and also play for the Hokuto Bank team. In 2011, she won the Smiling Fish International tournament in Thailand, and in 2014, she won the Polish Open. She also reach the final at the U.S. Open.

Achievements

BWF Grand Prix 
The BWF Grand Prix has two level such as Grand Prix and Grand Prix Gold. It is a series of badminton tournaments, sanctioned by Badminton World Federation (BWF) since 2007.

Women's Singles

 BWF Grand Prix Gold tournament
 BWF Grand Prix tournament

BWF International Challenge/Series
Women's Singles

 BWF International Challenge tournament
 BWF International Series tournament

References

External links 
 

Japanese female badminton players
Living people
1987 births
Sportspeople from Kōchi Prefecture